This is a non-exhaustive list of copulae in the English language, i.e. words used to link the subject of a sentence with a predicate (a subject complement). 

Because many of these copulative verbs may be used non-copulatively, examples are provided. Also, there can be other copulative verbs depending on the context and the meaning of the specific verb used. Therefore, this list is not an exhaustive one. 

act "Tom acted suspicious."
appear "Tom appears satisfied, but really is not."
be "Tom is a coward."
become (inchoative) "Tom became wealthy."
call in "Tom called in sick."
come "The prediction came true;" "the belt came loose;" "the characters in the story come alive"
come out "It came out burnt."
constitute "Verbs constitute one of the main word classes in the English language"
die "He died poor."
eat "Tom eats healthy."
emerge "Tom emerged unharmed after the incident."
end up "I ended up broke;" "the room ended up a mess."
equal "Two plus two equals four." 
get (inchoative)  "Tom got angry."
go "The man went crazy;" "Tom went bald;" "the food went bad;" "the mistake went unnoticed"
grow (inchoative) "Tom grew insistent."
fall "Tom fell ill with the flu."
feel "Tom felt nauseated."
freeze "The lake froze solid."
keep "Tom kept quiet."
lean "This area leans conservative."
look "Tom looks upset."
play "The possum played dead."
prove  "Tom's behavior proves difficult to understand."
remain "Tom remained unsatisfied."
run "Protectionist impulses run far too strong on Capitol Hill" (New York Times)
seem "Tom seems happy."
shine "Her smile shines bright."
smell "Tom smelled sweet"
sound "Tom sounded obnoxious."
stay "Tom stayed happy."
take "Tom took ill."
taste "The food tastes fresh."
turn (inchoative) "Tom turned angry."
turn up "Tom turned up missing."
wax "Tom waxed lyrical."

References

Copulae
Copulae